Alfred Thieme (1830 – 1906) was a German industrialist and art collector from Leipzig.

What little is known of his life was published in his art catalog, which was written by his son, the art historian Ulrich (known for Thieme-Becker) and the art historian Wilhelm von Bode. It was illustrated with engravings of artworks by Albert Krüger. He donated much of his collection, also known as the Thiemeschen Sammlung, to the Museum der bildenden Künste.

Thieme was also the father of Georg Thieme who founded a medical publishing business, today Thieme Medical Publishers.

Art collection

References
 Galerie Alfred Thieme in Leipzig, with an introduction by Wilhelm Bode, republished by Ulrich Thieme, Leipzig, 1900

External links
 

1830 births
1906 deaths
Businesspeople from Leipzig
German art collectors
19th-century art collectors
20th-century art collectors
German industrialists
19th-century German businesspeople
20th-century German businesspeople